Ronny Montero (born 15 May 1991) is a Bolivian footballer who play for Palmaflor.

Career
Montero C.D. Jorge Wilstermann in 2018 and won two national titles with the club prior to agreeing a new contract with the club in 2021. Montero joined Palmaflor ahead of the 2023 season.

International career
Montero made his senior international debut for the Bolivia national football team on 13 October 2018 during a 3–0 victory over Myanmar at the Thuwanna YTC Stadium.

Titles
  Oriente Petrolero 2010 (Torneo Clausura Bolivian Primera División)
  Wilstermann 2018 (Torneo Apertura Bolivian Primera División)
  Wilstermann 2019 (Torneo Clausura Bolivian Primera División)

References

living people
1991 births
Bolivian footballers
Association football central defenders
Bolivia international footballers
Oriente Petrolero players
Club Petrolero players
C.D. Jorge Wilstermann players
Club Real Potosí players